The Reunion Tour is a concert tour by Swedish post-hardcore band Refused, celebrating the band's reunion, after breaking-up in 1998. The tour began with a secret warm-up shows in the band's hometown of Umeå on 29 February 2012, as well as another small show in Stockholm, on 30 March, after which the band headed to start the official tour, in the United States.

The tour was not intended to be a full reunion and the band announced their show at the Exel Arena in Umeå, Sweden on 15 December would be their final show for three years.

Background 
BBC Radio 1's "Punk Show" announced on 2 January 2012, that Refused would be reuniting this year for a series of show. This was confirmed on frontman Dennis Lyxzén's Facebook page on 9 January 2012, as well as announcing the band's first reunion show, at the Coachella Valley Music and Arts Festival. Later, some European festival appearances were announced, such as Way Out West Festival in Sweden, and Groezrock in Belgium. The band was set to perform at the Sonisphere Festival, being their only exclusive UK appearance on the tour, though after the festival was cancelled, the band was instead booked to appear on the Download Festival.

Final shows 
The band announced five final shows, one in Norway and four in Sweden; with the band's final show taking place in their hometown of Umeå, Sweden.

Following the band's show at the Exel Arena in Umeå on 15 December, the band played four songs at an afterparty show the same night with the bands Final Exit and Abhinanda playing reunion shows.

Return 
On 25 November 2014, Refused announced that they will perform their first shows in three years at the Reading and Leeds Festivals, Groezrock and Amnesia Rockfest in the summer of 2015. They also headlined Punk Rock Bowling in Las Vegas in May 2015. The concerts were accompanied by the release of a new album called Freedom.

Set list

Tour dates

Support acts 

Cerebral Ballzy (22 April 2012)
Ceremony (23 April 2012)
Death Grips (12 April 2012)
Hårda Tider (29 February 2012)
Les Big Byrd (30 March 2012)
Off! ( 15–26 July 2012)
Pettybone ( 12–13 August)

Sleigh Bells ( 27–31 August 2012)
The Afghan Whigs (4 June 2012)
The Bots ( 13–14 August)
The Bronx (18 April 2012; 22 August 2012; 25 August 2012)
The Gaslight Anthem (4 June 2012)
The Hives (18 April 2012)
U.X. Vileheads (29 February 2012)
BLKOUT! (9 November 2012)
Nuclear Summer (11 November 2012)
Endless Heights (13 November 2012)
Outright ( 15–16 November 2012)
Hightime (17 November 2012)

As a support act 
Soundgarden (4 June 2012)

Personnel 
Dennis Lyxzén – lead vocals
Kristofer Steen – lead guitar, percussion
Jon Brännström – vocals, rhythm guitar (2012 shows only)
Magnus Flagge – bass guitar, cello
David Sandström – drums, percussion

References 

2012 concert tours
Reunion concert tours